Cinéma Vérité: Defining the Moment is 1999 Canadian documentary film directed by Peter Wintonick about cinéma vérité filmmaking. The film looks at the work of such notable documentary filmmakers as Jean Rouch, Frederick Wiseman, and Barbara Kopple and Robert Drew, as well as the contributions of the National Film Board of Canada through such films as Lonely Boy. The film also looks at the influence of cinéma vérité on the pioneering found footage horror film The Blair Witch Project, and interviews video-auteur Floria Sigismondi. Cinéma Vérité: Defining the Moment was produced by the NFB.

References

External links

Watch Cinéma Vérité: Defining the Moment at NFB.ca

Films directed by Peter Wintonick
1999 films
1999 documentary films
Documentary films about films
Works about documentary film
National Film Board of Canada documentaries
1990s English-language films
1990s Canadian films